The Monmouth Hawks women's basketball team represents Monmouth University in West Long Branch, New Jersey, United States. The school's team currently competes in the Colonial Athletic Association.

History
Monmouth began play in 1982. They played in the Cosmopolitan Conference from 1982 to 1986. In 1983, the Hawks went 14–14 while winning the Cosmopolitan Conference and getting the automatic bid to the NCAA Tournament. That year, they won the Opening round game versus Dartmouth 77–58 to advance to the First Round. They lost 107–35 to Cheyney. This remains their only NCAA Tournament appearance. They joined the ECAC Metro in 1986, which rebranded as the Northeast Conference in 1988. The Hawks won the NEC tournament in 1987 going 16–0 in conference play while beating Fairleigh Dickinson 92–65 for their first (and so far only) conference tournament title. However, they did not go to the NCAA Tournament due to the conference not having an automatic bid to the tournament until 1994. In 1988, they won the regular season title again with a 16–0 record, but they lost to Robert Morris 63–60 in the final. The Hawks left the conference for the MAAC after the 2012–13 season. As of the end of the 2015–16 season, the Hawks have an all-time record of 520–473.

In the 2020–21 season, they went 2–16 and lost in the first round of the MAAC tournament. The team has not achieved a winning record since the 2011–2012 season. On March 11, 2021, former head coach Jody Craig resigned two days after a suspension. On April 8, 2021, Ginny Boggess was named the ninth head women's basketball coach in program history.

Season by season results

NCAA Division I appearances
The Hawks have made two NCAA Division I Tournament appearance. They have a record of 1–1.

References

External links